Saint-Maximin-la-Sainte-Baume is a commune in the southeastern French department of Var, in the Provence-Alpes-Côte d'Azur region. Baume or bama is the Provençal equivalent of cave. The town's basilica is dedicated to Mary Magdalene.

History
The Roman Villa Lata, remains of which have been identified beneath Place Malherbe in the center of the town, was one among numerous agricultural working Roman villas in the plain that was traversed by the via Aurelia. The Abbey of Saint Victor at Marseille had dependencies in the neighborhood: Saint-Maximin, Saint-Jean, Saint-Mitre, Sainte-Marie. The Romanesque parish church dedicated to Saint Maximin of Trier was demolished in the final stages of constructing the basilica.

In the 12th century, Berenguer Ramon I, Count of Provence, established Saint-Maximin as a town uniquely under his care. In 1246, following the death of Raymond IV Berenger, Provence passed through his younger daughter to Charles d'Anjou, brother of Louis IX of France and sometime king of Sicily. The tenuous Anjou presence at Saint-Maximin was fiercely contested by the seigneurs of Baux among other local leaders.

The French baritone Louis Gassier (1820–1871) was born in Saint-Maximin-la-Sainte-Baume.

The cultus of Mary Magdalene
The little town was transformed by the well-published discovery on 12 December 1279, in the crypt of Saint-Maximin, of a sarcophagus that was proclaimed to be the tomb of Mary Magdalene, signalled by miracles and by the ensuing pilgrim-drawing cult of Mary Magdalene and Saint Maximin, that was assiduously cultivated by Charles II of Anjou, King of Naples. He founded the massive Gothic Basilique Ste. Marie-Madeleine in 1295; the basilica had the blessing of Boniface VIII, who placed it under the new teaching order of Dominicans.

The founding tradition held that relics of Mary Magdalene were preserved here, and not at Vézelay, and that she, her brother Lazarus, and a certain Maximinus fled the Holy Land by a miraculous boat with neither rudder nor sail and landed at Saintes-Maries-de-la-Mer, in the Camargue near Arles. Maximinus is venerated as St Maximin, a name shared by the 3rd-century Maximin of Trier and the 1st-century martyr, Maximinus of Aix, whom medieval legend conflated with the later Maximin; the conflated Maximin was added in the discussed medieval period to earlier lists of the Seventy Disciples.

After landing in the Camargue, Mary Magdalene came to Marseille and converted the local people.  Later in life, according to the founding legend, she retired to a cave in the Sainte-Baume mountains. She was buried in Saint-Maximin, which was not a place of pilgrimage in early times, though there is a Gallo-Roman crypt under the basilica. Sarcophagi are shown, of St Maximin, Ste. Marcelle, Ste. Suzanne and St. Sidoine (Sidonius) as well as the reliquary, which is said to hold the remains of Mary Magdalene. Genetic testing of some of the hairs in the reliquary confirmed that it was the hair of a woman of possible Jewish ancestry, but do not confirm the identity of the source of the hair.

Construction of the basilica, begun in 1295, was complete as to the crypt when it was consecrated in 1316. In it were installed a Gallo-Roman funerary monument—of the 4th century in fact—and four marble sarcophagi, whose bas-reliefs permit a Christian identification.

The Black Death in 1348, which killed half the local population, interrupted the building campaign, which was not taken up again until 1404, but found the sixth bay of the nave complete by 1412. Work continued until 1532, when it was decided to leave the basilica just as it was, without a finished west front or portal or belltowers, features that it lacks to this day. The plan has a main apse flanked by two subsidiary apses. Its great aisled nave is without transept. The nave is flanked by sixteen chapels in the aisles.

Geography

Climate

Saint-Maximin-la-Sainte-Baume has a hot-summer Mediterranean climate (Köppen climate classification Csa).

Gallery

Population

Administration
List of mayors of Saint-Maximin-la-Sainte-Baume (partial):
2020-present: Alain Decanis
2017-2020: Horace Lanfranchi
2014-2017: Christine Lanfranchi-Dorgal (UMP)
2008-2014: Alain Penal (UMP)
2001-2008: Gabriel Rinaudo (RPR)
1995-2001: Horace Lanfranchi (RPR)

References

Further reading
 Katherine Ludwig Jansen, The Making of the Magdalen: Preaching and Popular Devotion in the Later Middle Ages (Princeton University Press) 2000.
Hares-Stryker, Carolyn, 1993. "Adrift on the seven seas: the medieval topos of exile at sea", Florilegium 12 (on-line text; pdf file)

External links

Official website 
Website about Saint-Maximin-la-Sainte-Baume 
History of the basilica with special reference to its organ (musiqueorguequebec.ca, in French)

Communes of Var (department)
French Riviera